Volodymyr Kubijovyč, also spelled Kubiiovych or Kubiyovych (23 September 1900, Nowy Sącz, Kingdom of Galicia and Lodomeria – 2 November 1985, Paris, France) was an anthropological geographer in prewar Poland, a wartime Ukrainian nationalist politician and a post-war émigré intellectual of mixed Ukrainian-Polish background.

During the war Kubijovyč headed the social welfare and the economic committee called UCC. In 1943, he was a founder of the 14th Waffen Grenadier Division of the SS. Kubijovyč was a supporter of the OUN-M, Andriy Melnyk's faction in the Organization of Ukrainian Nationalists. After the collapse of Nazi Germany, Kubijovyč settled in France. He later became the chief editor of the Encyclopedia of Ukraine and the Secretary General of Shevchenko Scientific Society. Kubijovyč also supported other projects of the Ukrainian diaspora. He died in Paris on 2 November 1985.

Early life

Kubijovyč was born in 1900 in Nowy Sącz; his father Mykhailo was a Greek-Catholic of Ukrainian descent, while his mother was Maria Dobrowolska, a Catholic of Polish extraction. He was baptized into the Ukrainian Greek Catholic Church and, as he stated, became automatically Ruthenian but grew up in mix Polish-Ukrainian surroundings and spoke both, Ukrainian and Polish. At age 13, he read Mykhailo Hrushevsky's multi-volume History of Ukraine-Rusʹ. Between the ages of 15 and 18, Kubijovyč studied cartography, he also read books by Henryk Sienkiewicz in Polish and other works in German. In 1918, Kubijovyč enrolled on a doctoral programme at the Jagiellonian University in Kraków, but World War I and his enlistment into the Ukrainian Galician Army interrupted his education. He returned home on sick leave with Typhus before the end of the Polish-Ukrainian war and, in 1919, resumed his studies at the Jagiellonian University in Kraków. In 1923, Kubijovyč concluded his doctorate and successfully defended his habilitation on 9 May 1928. In 1932, he became a member of the Shevchenko Scientific Society in Lwów (today Lviv). During the years 1928 to 1939, Kubijovyč taught at Cracow's Jagiellonian University as a lecturer (docent) and collaborated with various academic institution. In recognition of his work, Kubijovych obtained a financial scholarship from the Polish Ministry of Religious Affairs and Public Education for his journey to Czechoslovakia and Romania. He also received time off from his university duties.

In 1939, was denied further tenure under political pressure from the Polish Ministry of War. In 1940, he was appointed professor of the Ukrainian Free University in Prague.

Before 1939, Kubijovyč's scholarly works concentrated on the geography and demography of the Carpathian Mountains, especially the eastern Beskids, populated largely by the Ukrainian-speaking minority. At this time, he questioned official Polish statistics concerning the ethnic make-up of the inter-war Polish Republic and maintained that the official numbers of Ukrainians were grossly understated. He was an editor and co-author of the pioneering Ukrainian-language Atlas of Ukraine and Adjacent Lands (1937) and the equally pioneering Ukrainian-language Geography of Ukraine and Neighbouring Lands (1938, 1943).[citation needed]

Second World War

Kubijovyč was a supporter of the OUN-M (Andriy Melnyk's faction in the Organization of Ukrainian Nationalists). He was one of the major Ukrainian collaborators with Nazi Germany. In April 1941, Kubijovyč asked Hans Frank to create under the auspices of Nazi Germany an ethnically filtered Ukrainian area within the General Government or an autonomous state, where Poles and Jews would not be allowed to live.

Volodymyr Kubijovyč was elected as its head. The UCC was the only officially authorized Ukrainian social welfare organization in the Nazi-occupied Polish territories, with a mandate to care for the elderly, sick and homeless, and to look after the welfare of the Ukrainian workers sent to Germany from the General Government. As part of its activities, it published anti-Semitic materials in the collaborationist press In 1943, Volodymyr Kubijovyč worked closely with a high-ranking member of the SS Otto Wächter in organizing the Waffen-SS Galizien. On 2 May 1943, he publicly announced his willingness to take up arms and declared himself ready to join the newly formed Ukrainian Waffen-SS.

Throughout the war, Kubijovyč used his German contacts to shield the western Ukrainian population from Nazi policies. In 1943, as Ukrainian peasants in the Zamość region were accused of resistance, Volodymyr Kubijovyč successfully intervened with Hans Frank to prevent reprisals. At other times, he was reduced to writing in protest to the German authorities against the impact of their rule of terror on the Ukrainian civilian population, which included unprovoked public abuse, arbitrary killings and mass shootings. Some of this material was later brought up as evidence at the Nuremberg Trials.

According to some Ukrainian sources, Kubijovyč tried to use his official position to ameliorate Ukrainian-Polish wartime tensions in Galicia by calling for an end to the armed underground conflict between the two sides in 1944. These sources also credit him with saving some three hundred people, most of them Jews, from arrest by the Nazi authorities.

As the Red Army approached, in 1944 Kubijovyč and his Ukrainian Central Committee fled German-occupied Poland to Germany.

Emigration

At the time of Nazi Germany's capitulation Kubijovyč was in the American occupation zone, from where he moved to France. In Germany, he reorganized the Shevchenko Scientific Society as an émigré institution. He acted as its Secretary General from 1947 to 1963, and, from 1952, President of its European branch.[citation needed]

In exile, Kubijovyč became the chief editor of the Ukrainian-language Encyclopedia of Ukrainian Studies (Entsyklopediia ukrainoznavstva, 10 vols., 1949–84), the largest scholarly project undertaken by Ukrainian émigrés during the Cold War. Reflecting Kubijovyč's own strong Ukrainophile views, it was intended to preserve the Ukrainian national heritage, which he saw as being neglected and downgraded under the Soviet rule. The English translation of its thematic section, Ukraine: A Concise Encyclopædia, was published in two volumes in 1963–71. A revised and expanded English-language edition of the ten-volume alphabetic part appeared under the title Encyclopedia of Ukraine in Canada in the 1980s and 1990s, only after Kubijovyč's death, and is presently being put on-line.

During his exile in France Kubijovyč enjoyed considerable prestige as the most prominent Ukrainian scholar in the West. He drew the respect of the Polish intellectual Jerzy Giedroyć, another resident of Paris, who noted in his autobiography that Kubijovyč had behaved honourably during the war ("Zachował się świetnie"). In 1991, after Ukraine declared independence from the Soviet Union, scholars in Ukraine began reprinting Kubijovyč's major works, especially his encyclopedias, making them available to a wider readership in the home country for the first time.[citation needed]

In his later years, Kubijovyč published three volumes of memoirs describing his experiences in interwar Poland and during the Second World War, and his émigré scholarly life in Germany and France during the Cold War. The most wide-ranging of these was the Ukrainian-language volume titled I am 85 Years Old (Paris and Munich, 1985).

Volodymyr Kubijovyč died on 2 November 1985 in Paris.

Modern legacy

After the collapse of the Soviet Union, the hostile Soviet propaganda line on Kubijovyč lost its official status and was replaced by a nationalist line. His works, including his encyclopedias, were published in Ukraine where they are now in wide circulation.[citation needed] In 2000 a pre-stamped envelope was issued by the Ukrainian postal service honouring the hundredth anniversary of Kubijovyč's birthday.

References 
General

 
 
  A sympathetic and detailed account of his life and work in Ukrainian written by a professional geographer.

Inline

External links 
 Danylo Husar Struk and Arkadiy Zhukovsky, "Kubijovyč, Volodymyr", Internet Encyclopedia of Ukraine, updated 2014
 Українська Дивізія Галичина
 Archives of Volodymyr Kubijovyč (Volodymyr Kubijovic fonds, R6531) are held at Library and Archives Canada
 Letter of Volodymyr Kubijovyč to Hans Frank about the treatment of Ukrainian population under Nazi rule, 1943

1900 births
1985 deaths
People from Nowy Sącz
Jagiellonian University alumni
Ukrainian geographers
Military history of Germany during World War II
Ukrainian politicians before 1991
World War II political leaders
Ukrainian refugees
Members of the Shevchenko Scientific Society
Ukrainian editors
20th-century geographers
Ukrainian collaborators with Nazi Germany